The Namib chirping gecko (Ptenopus carpi), also known commonly as Carp's barking gecko, is a species of lizard in the family Gekkonidae. The species is endemic to Namibia.

Etymology
The specific name, carpi, is in honor of South African amateur naturalist Bernhard Carp (1901–1966), who was a financial supporter of museum expeditions.

Habitat

Description
Dorsally, it has 3–5 dark brown crossbars on the body, and 5-9 more on the tail. Ventrally, it is white. A yellow heart-shaped spot may be present on the throat.

Behavior
P. carpi is nocturnal and digs burrows. It shelters in these burrows during the day.

Vocalization
Males of P. carpi make barking or chirping sounds to attract females.

Reproduction
P. carpi is oviparous.

References

Further reading
Brain CK (1962). "A review of the gecko genus Ptenopus with the description of a new species". Cimbebasia (1): 1–18. (Ptenopus carpi, new species).
Gramentz D (2008). "Zum bioakustischen Verhalten von Ptenopus carpi Brain, 1961 ". Sauria 30 (1): 43–46. (in German).
Haacke WD (1976). "The Burrowing Geckos of Southern Africa: 5. Phylogenetic and Taxonomic Affinities". Annals of the Transvaal Museum 30 (6): 71–89.
Rösler H (2000). "Kommentierte Liste der rezent, subrezent und fossil bekannten Geckotaxa (Reptilia: Gekkonomorpha)". Gekkota 2: 28–153. (Ptenopus carpi, p. 107). (in German).

Endemic fauna of Namibia
Ptenopus
Reptiles described in 1962
Reptiles of Namibia